The Latin Grammy Award for Best Recording Package is an honor presented annually at the Latin Grammy Awards, a ceremony that recognizes excellence and promotes awareness of cultural diversity and contributions of Latin recording artists in the United States and internationally.

The description of the category at the 2020 Latin Grammy Awards states that is "for graphic design, quality and concept recording packages, in any configuration, released for the first time during the Eligibility Year; even if contents were previously released and providing the packaging is new. Only original artwork is eligible.  Also eligible are digital recording packages providing proper credits and supporting material are received." The award goes to the art director(s).

Winners and nominees

2000s

2010s

2020s

References

External links
Official site of the Latin Grammy Awards

Recording Package